The M8 is a short metropolitan route in the City of Johannesburg, South Africa. It starts in Florida Park, Roodepoort and ends in Linden, Randburg to the east.

Route
The M8 begins as a T-junction with the M18 Ontdekkers Road in Florida Park and heads in a north-east direction as William Nichol Drive. Here it intersects the M47 at Hendrik Potgieter Drive, crossing underneath the road as it continues east as 14th Avenue and after a short distance intersects the N1 Western Bypass in Fairland. After a short distance, the M8 turns north-east as Weltervreden Road in Berario and as Pendoring Road in Northcliff. Here the M8 crosses Beyers Naude Drive and continues north-east, for a short distance, as a Judges Avenue in Cresta and crosses M20 Republic Road. Continuing eastwards as Judges Avenue and intersects R512 Malibongwe Drive, Cresta as a T-junction. Here the M8 turns north, briefly co-signed with the R512 for 100m and then turns east as the one-way South Road. It reaches 1st Street in Linden where it turns left then right continue south-east and after a brief interval reaches an intersection of M71 at Bram Fischer Drive.

References

Streets and roads of Johannesburg
Metropolitan routes in Johannesburg